The Glasair Merlin is a light-sport aircraft under development by  Chinese-owned, United States-based Glasair Aviation. It will be supplied as a ready-to-fly Special LSA aircraft.

The aircraft first flew on 7 April 2015 at Arlington, Washington and was accepted as a light-sport aircraft in late March 2016.

Design and development

Introduced in 2014, the Merlin LSA is a high-wing, two seats in side-by-side configuration, tricycle gear aircraft of all-composite construction. Avionics include a Dynon Skyview touch. A ballistic parachute is optional.

The aircraft will sell for US$139,000 for a well-equipped model. The design will carry two people and full fuel and is intended for use as a trainer and personal aircraft.

Specifications (Merlin LSA)

References

External links
 Podcast interview with Glasair's Nick Frisch about the Merlin on AVweb

Glasair aircraft
Single-engined tractor aircraft
Light-sport aircraft
High-wing aircraft
Aircraft first flown in 2015